Otto Thiel (23 November 1891 – 10 July 1913) was a German amateur footballer who played as a forward and competed in the 1912 Summer Olympics. He was a member of the German Olympic squad and played one match in the consolation tournament.

References

External links
 
Profile at Sports-reference.com

1891 births
1913 deaths
German footballers
Germany international footballers
Olympic footballers of Germany
Footballers at the 1912 Summer Olympics
BFC Preussen players
Association football forwards